Polanco is a municipality located in the autonomous community of Cantabria, Spain. It has a population of 5,585 inhabitants (2013).

References

Municipalities in Cantabria